In April 2013, the Bonaire Football Federation was granted associate membership in CONCACAF and was promoted to full membership in June 2014. Bonaire also became a full member of the Caribbean Football Union in 2013.

Below is a list of footballers who have appeared for the Bonaire national football team since being accepted into CONCACAF. Players who represented Bonaire in unofficial internationals before obtaining CONCACAF membership are not included.

A
Jerson Agostien
Jursen Albertus

B
Robbert Barendse
Suehendley Barzey
Angenor Beaumont
Jozef Beaumont
Sigrel Burnet

C
Kevinson Cecilia
Leonard Coffie
Naygel Coffie
Raymiro Coffie

F
Tevin Francis
Rishison Frans
Robert Frans
Terrence Frans

G
Igmard Gijsbertha

H
Tom Homburg

J
Rilove Janga
Rolando Janzen
Matias Jaurretche
Rugenio Josephia

M
Giovanie Makaai
Justin Michel
Guillermo Montero

P
Lacey Pauletta
André Piar
Ilfred Piar

R
Pedro Rodriguez Vergara

S
Yurick Seinpaal
Giandro Steba

T
Rachid Trenidad
Terrance Trinidad

V
Miguel Valenzuela Ore
Reuben Vlijt

W
Edelbert Winklaar

Z
Christian Zuninga

Source(s):

References

External links
Caribbean Football Database profile

Bonaire footballers
Bonaire
Association football player non-biographical articles